Aba Khel is the subtribe of Mandanr Yusafzai Pashtun tribe in Swabi District of Khyber Pakhtunkhwa of Pakistan. They are settled in villages Zaida, Kaddi, Hund, Shah Mansur, Khunda, Ambar, Panj Pir, Beka, Aryan, Lahor and Kheshgi (District Nowshera).

History
Yusafzai are named after Yusaf who was the son of Manday along with Umar. Umar died early and left behind his son Mandanr who married the daughter of his uncle Yusaf. The  are together called Yusafzai. 

Mandanr, the son of Umar had four sons namely Munu, Razar, Hazar & Mahmood.

Munu then had two sons namely Usman and Utman.

The descendants of Sadu, son of Utman are called  who are divided into five families namely Aba Khel, Umar Khel, Khadu Khel, Mir Ahmed Khel and Behzad Khel. The tombs of Aba and Umar are present between the villages of Panj Pir and Darra marking the boundary between Aba Khel and Umar Khel.

Aba, the forefather of Aba Khel subtribe had two sons namely Nusrat and Daulat.

The descendants of  inhabit villages Zaida, Kaddi, Panj Pir, Hund, Beka, Nabi, Aryan, Ambar, Lahor, Balu, & Sala while the descendants of Daulat live in villages Shah Mansur and Khunda.

The eldest son of Nusrat was Ulas or Usi and gave rise to  who are divided in seven Khel based on seven sons of Usi. They are Balar Khel, Taju Khel, Ayub Khel, Zakarya Khel, Panj Pao, Tawus Khel and Bazaid Khel.
Usi Khan younger brother (safu Khan) whose children live in village Nabi next to Beka, called safu khail.

References
 
 

Yusufzai Pashtun tribes